Emma Harbor can refer to:

a bay in Chukotka, Russia, now Komsomolskaya Bay, a branch of Provideniya Bay, see Providence Bay, Siberia,

Emma Haven, now Teluk Bayur, a harbor serving Padang, West Sumatra, Indonesia.